Louis-Claude Chéron de La Bruyère (28 October 1758, in Paris – 13 November 1807, in Poitiers) was a French politician, playwright and translator.

Works 
Theatre 
 Caton d'Utique, tragedy in 3 acts and in verse, imitated from Addison (1789)
L'Homme à sentimens, ou le Tartuffe de mœurs, comedy in 5 acts and in verse, partly imitated from The School for Scandal by Sheridan, Paris, French comedians of the Comédie Italienne, 10 March 1789. Reworked and abridged  under the title Valsain et Florville (1803).
Translations
Richard Lovell Edgeworth and Maria Edgeworth: Leçons de l'enfance (5 volumes, 1803)
Elizabeth Hamilton: Lettres sur les principes élémentaires d'éducation (2 volumes, 1804)
Henry Fielding: Tom Jones, or Histoire d'un enfant trouvé (6 volumes, 1804)

Sources 
 Henri Mataigne, Histoire d'Auvers sur Oise.

External links 
 Louis-Claude Chéron de La Bruyère on Data.bnf.fr

Members of the Legislative Assembly (France)
18th-century French dramatists and playwrights
19th-century French dramatists and playwrights
English–French translators
Writers from Paris
1758 births
1807 deaths
19th-century French translators
18th-century French translators